Pyramid Canyon is the canyon on the Colorado River where Davis Dam was built on the state line between Nevada and Arizona.  The canyon is located on the Colorado River, between Cottonwood Valley on the north and the Mohave Valley to the south.  To the west of the canyon are the Newberry Mountains, and to the east are the Black Mountains of Arizona.  Originally a deep canyon between the two ranges containing the free flowing Colorado River, Pyramid Canyon is now filled by the lower reach of Lake Mohave a reservoir formed by Davis Dam.

References 

Canyons and gorges of Nevada
Canyons and gorges of Arizona
Colorado River
Landforms of Clark County, Nevada
Landforms of Mohave County, Arizona
Lower Colorado River Valley